Discogobio microstoma is a fish species in the genus Discogobio endemic to northern Vietnam.

References

External links 

Cyprinid fish of Asia
Fish described in 1978
Discogobio